A continent pass (usually called something like Europe (air)pass, Pacific (air)pass or American (air)pass) is a product and service of an airline alliance. For a relatively low price the traveler can travel freely using all intra-continental flights the airline alliance offers on that continent. There are restrictions on the number of miles, flights or stops the traveler can make. Travelers can benefit from the extensive networks airline alliances offer and can earn reward points for each mile they fly by participating in the alliance's frequent flyer program.

See also
 e-ticket
 InterRail - a similar pass for European railways
 Open-jaw ticket
 Round-the-world ticket

References

Airline tickets